The women's Laser Radial competition at the 2014 Asian Games in Incheon was held from 24 to 30 September 2014.

Schedule
All times are Korea Standard Time (UTC+09:00)

Results
Legend
DNE — Disqualification not excludable
OCS — On course side

References

Results

External links
Official website

Women's Laser Radial